Scioto is a word of Wyandot origin given to the Scioto River, which flows southwards from north central Ohio to the Ohio River.

Scioto may also refer to:

Places

In Ohio
Little Scioto River (disambiguation), several flowing watercourses
Scioto Audubon Metro Park, in Columbus
Scioto Country Club, in Upper Arlington
Scioto County, Ohio, at the confluence of the Scioto and Ohio rivers
Scioto County Airport, a general aviation facility
Scioto Furnace, Ohio, an unincorporated community in Scioto County
Scioto Grange No. 1234, a historic building in Jackson
Scioto Greenway Trail, in Columbus
Scioto Mile, a collection of parks and trails in Columbus
Scioto Mile Fountain
Scioto Mile Promenade
Scioto Ordnance Plant, a WWII-era incendiary munitions factory
Scioto Peninsula, a land feature of the neighborhood of Franklinton (Columbus, Ohio)
Scioto Township (disambiguation), several places
Scioto Trail State Forest, in Pike and Ross counties

In other states
Scioto Mills, Illinois, an unincorporated community in Stephenson County 
Sod, West Virginia ( Scioto), an unincorporated community in Lincoln County

Animals
Scioto madtom (Noturus trautmani), an extinct species of freshwater fish
Scioto pigtoe (Pleurobema bournianum), a species of freshwater mussel

Other uses
Scioto Company, a French land company, established 1787, which operated in America
Scioto Lounge, a series of bronze sculptures in Columbus, Ohio